You Go Your Way may refer to:

Music

Albums
You Go Your Way, album by Amy Correia 2009

Songs
"You Go Your Way", song written by Bob Russell (songwriter), recorded Tina Mason
You Go Your Way (Alan Jackson song)
You Go Your Way, alternative title as Davy Jones 1967, and Eve (1960s singer) 1967, of Most Likely You Go Your Way (And I'll Go Mine), song by Bob Dylan
"You Go Your Way", song by Bristol band Shakane Adrian Castillo 1973
You Can Go Your Own Way, single by Chris Rea 1994

Books
You Go Your Way, by Katharine Brush (1941)